Jeremy Karikari (born 23 July 1987) is a Ghanaian-German former professional footballer who plays as a defensive midfielder or right-back.

External links
 
 

1987 births
Living people
German sportspeople of Ghanaian descent
German footballers
Footballers from Hamburg
Association football midfielders
Association football fullbacks
2. Bundesliga players
3. Liga players
FC St. Pauli players
VfB Stuttgart II players
SSV Jahn Regensburg players
SV Eintracht Trier 05 players
VfL Osnabrück players
RB Leipzig players
SV Elversberg players
FC Eintracht Norderstedt 03 players
TuS Dassendorf players